Major Barbara is a play by George Bernard Shaw.

Major Barbara may also refer to:

Major Barbara (film), a 1941 film based on the play
"Major Barbara," a song by the rock band Aerosmith, on the album Pandora's Box